Ardmore, Alberta is a hamlet in northern Alberta, Canada within the Municipal District of Bonnyville No. 87.

The community's name may be a transfer from a place of the same name in Ireland or Scotland.

Demographics 

See also 
List of communities in Alberta
List of designated places in Alberta
List of hamlets in Alberta

References 

Municipal District of Bonnyville No. 87
Hamlets in Alberta
Designated places in Alberta